Anna Höll (born 12 November 1981) is a German sailor. She competed in the Yngling event at the 2004 Summer Olympics.

References

External links
 

1981 births
Living people
German female sailors (sport)
Olympic sailors of Germany
Sailors at the 2004 Summer Olympics – Yngling
Sportspeople from Munich